Tarlok Singh (died 10 December 2005) was member of the Planning Commission of India and a civil servant.

Singh studied at London School of Economics. He served on the Planning Commission of India from its inception until his retirement in 1967. He was a member of the Indian Civil Service from 1937 to 1962. He wrote India's first five year plan.

Singh was also the first Private Secretary to Jawaharlal Nehru, the first Prime Minister of India. He was the Director General of Rehabilitation in the Punjab responsible for the resettlement of refugees  and served as the UNICEF Deputy Executive Director (Planning) from 1970 to 1974.

He was the first Chairman of the Indian Association of Social Science Institutions (who sponsor an annual memorial lecture in his name) and was awarded the Padma Vibhushan (2000), the Padma Bhushan (1962) and the Padma Shri in 1954 by the President of India.

Singh was also awarded the Soderstrom Medal for Economics in 1970 by the Royal Swedish Academy of Science in Stockholm.

His books included Poverty and Social Change, Land Resettlement Manual for Displaced Persons, The Planning Process, Towards an Integrated Society, and India's Development Experience.

References

External links
 

Indian civil servants
Recipients of the Padma Shri in civil service
Recipients of the Padma Vibhushan in civil service
Alumni of the London School of Economics
Punjabi people
Indian Civil Service (British India) officers
Recipients of the Padma Bhushan in civil service
Date of birth missing
2005 deaths
Members of the Planning Commission of India